Daniel, Dan, Danny or Dany Silva may refer to:

Sports
Danny Silva (baseball) (1896–1974), American baseball player
Daniel Silva (golfer) (born 1966), Portuguese golfer
Daniel Conceicao Silva (born 1970), known as just Daniel, Brazilian football midfielder
Danny Silva (born 1973), Portuguese-American cross-country skier
Daniel Silva (athlete) (born 1979), Brazilian blind Paralympic track athlete
Daniel Eduardo Silva (born 1985), Portuguese cyclist
Dani Silva (born 2000), Portuguese football midfielder

Others
Daniel P. Silva (born 1943), American politician
Daniel Silva (novelist) (born 1960), American novelist
Dany Silva (fl. 1970s–present), Cape Verdean musician
Dan Silva, Belizean politician
Daniel Silva (tattooist) (born 1993), American celebrity tattoo artist and reality TV show participant

See also
Daniel da Silva (disambiguation) 
Danilo da Silva (disambiguation)
Daniel Silva dos Santos (1982–2019), Brazilian footballer
Daniel Cáceres Silva (born 1982), Paraguayan footballer
Daniel De Silva (born 1997), Australian football player